Iltalehti (literally "Evening newspaper") is a tabloid newspaper published in Helsinki, Finland.

History and profile
Iltalehti was established in 1980 as afternoon edition of newspaper Uusi Suomi. Alma Media is the owner of Iltalehti which is based in Helsinki. Its sister newspapers are Aamulehti and Kauppalehti. Iltalehti is published in tabloid format six times per week.

Petri Hakala served as the editor-in-chief of Iltalehti. On 1 September 2010 Panu Pokkinen was appointed to the post. His term ended in December 2013 when Petri Hakala was reappointed to the post.

Circulation
The circulation of Iltalehti was 105,059 copies in 1993. The 2001 circulation of the paper was 134,777 copies, making it the fourth most read newspaper in Finland. In 2002 Iltalehti had a circulation of 132,836 copies on weekdays. The circulation of the paper was 126,000 copies in 2003, making it the fourth best selling newspaper in the country. The 2004 circulation of the paper was 130,000 copies.

The paper had a circulation of 130,290 copies in 2005 and of 133,007 copies in 2006. Its circulation was 131,150 copies in 2007. In 2008 Iltalehti was the third largest newspaper in Finland.  Of tabloid newspapers, the paper had a market share of 40% and its biggest (and only) rival Ilta-Sanomat had a market share of 60% in 2008. Its circulation was 122,548 copies in 2008 and it dropped to 112,778 copies in 2009. It was 107,052 copies in 2010 and 102,124 copies in 2011. It fell to 91,219 copies in 2012 and to 78,617 copies in 2013.

In 2010 the online version of Iltalehti was the most visited website in Finland in 2010 and was visited by 1,937,156 people per week.

In May 2015 it was the 6th the most popular website in the country according to Alexa.

References

External links

  
 About Iltalehti

1980 establishments in Finland
Finnish-language newspapers
Finnish news websites
Daily newspapers published in Finland
Newspapers published in Helsinki
Publications established in 1980